Christian Tarr (May 25, 1765 – February 24, 1833) was a member of the U.S. House of Representatives from Pennsylvania.

Christian Tarr was born in Baltimore, Maryland.  He moved to Westmoreland County, Pennsylvania, in 1794 and engaged in agricultural pursuits.  He was also engaged in the manufacture of pottery in Fayette County, Pennsylvania.

Tarr was elected as a Republican to the Fifteenth and Sixteenth Congresses.  He was a member of the Pennsylvania House of Representatives in 1821 and 1822.  He was appointed on October 31, 1827, as superintendent of the road which had been built by the United States Government from Cumberland, Maryland, to Wheeling, Virginia (now West Virginia).  He served until March 20, 1829.  He died in Washington Township, Fayette County, Pennsylvania, and was interred in the Methodist Graveyard in Brownsville, Pennsylvania.

Sources

The Political Graveyard

External links

Members of the Pennsylvania House of Representatives
National Road
1765 births
1833 deaths
Democratic-Republican Party members of the United States House of Representatives from Pennsylvania